This is a list of Bristol Rovers F.C. managers since the club appointed its first full-time manager in 1899, along with the number of competitive games managed, winning percentage and titles won.

Although the club were founded in 1883, they did not appoint a full-time manager until 1899, when Alfred Homer, who was assistant secretary of Aston Villa, was appointed as manager-secretary of Bristol Rovers, a position he held for twenty-one years. On joining the Football League in 1920, the club appointed Ben Hall to the manager's post. Hall held the job for one year before handing over to Andrew Wilson, the club's first non-English manager.

The next significant manager of Bristol Rovers was Albert Prince-Cox, who introduced blue-and-white quarters as the team's kit because he believed it made the players look larger and more intimidating. He also became the first manager to win a major cup competition with the club when they won the Division 3 (South) Cup in 1935. More success followed in the 1952–53 season when Bristol Rovers' longest serving post-war manager, Bert Tann, won a league title for the first time since 1905 and won promotion for the first time ever when the club won Division 3 (South). Tann remained in charge for eighteen years from 1950 to 1968.

Don Megson was the next manager to win a major trophy, taking the Watney Cup in 1972 in only his third game in charge. Following this, only two more managers won any silverware at a national level. These were Gerry Francis, who won the Division 3 title in 1989–90, and most recently Paul Trollope, who won the League 2 play-off final in 2007. That was until the appointment of Darrell Clarke who guided Bristol Rovers to back-to-back promotions, the first in the club's history making him the most successful Bristol Rovers manager ever. 

In all the club has had 33 full-time managers (excluding caretaker managers).

Managers
All statistics are from Bristol Rovers Football Club – The Definitive History 1883–2003 unless otherwise stated.
Information correct as of match played 18 February 2023

Notes

References

Bibliography

External links
Bristol Rovers official website

Bristol Rovers F.C. managers
Bristol Rovers F.C.
Bristol Rovers managers